Edgar Barens (born 1962) is an American documentary film maker. Barens is nominated for an Academy Award for Best Documentary (Short Subject) for the 2013 film Prison Terminal: The Last Days of Private Jack Hall.

References

External links

American documentary filmmakers
Living people
1962 births